Days of Betrayal is a 1973 Czechoslovakian drama film directed by Otakar Vávra. The film was entered into the 8th Moscow International Film Festival where it won a Diploma. It was also selected as the Czechoslovakian entry for the Best Foreign Language Film at the 46th Academy Awards, but was not accepted as a nominee. The film was meant as the first part of Vávra's "war trilogy" consisting of movies Days of Betrayal, Sokolovo and Liberation of Prague.

Cast
 Jiří Pleskot as Dr. Edvard Beneš
 Bohuš Pastorek as Klement Gottwald
 Gunnar Möller as Adolf Hitler
 Jaroslav Radimecký as Neville Chamberlain
 Martin Gregor as Édouard Daladier
 Bořivoj Navrátil as Sergey S. Alexandrovsky
 Otakar Brousek Sr. as Bonnet
 Josef Langmiler as Cooper
 Rudolf Krátký as Dr. Paul Schmidt – Hitler's interpreter
 Günter Zschieschow as K. H. Frank
 Fred Alexander as Joseph Goebbels
 Rudolf Jurda as Hermann Göring

See also
 List of submissions to the 46th Academy Awards for Best Foreign Language Film
 List of Czechoslovak submissions for the Academy Award for Best Foreign Language Film

References

External links
 

1973 films
1973 drama films
1970s war drama films
1970s historical drama films
1970s Czech-language films
Films directed by Otakar Vávra
Czech war drama films
Czech historical drama films
Czech political drama films
Films set in 1938
1970s political drama films
Czech World War II films
Czechoslovak World War II films
1970s Czech films
Czech films based on actual events
Czech epic films
Czech propaganda films